Jeong of Balhae (died 812?) (r. 809–812?) was the seventh king of Balhae.  He was the son of King Gang. Little is known of his reign, save that he chose the era name Yeongdeok (永德, "eternal virtue"). After his death, his brother succeeded him as King Hui.He married and had a son named Dae Yeon-jin.

See also
List of Korean monarchs
History of Korea

References

Balhae rulers
Mohe peoples
812 deaths
9th-century rulers in Asia
Year of birth unknown